Beaver Township is one of twelve townships in Pulaski County, Indiana, United States. As of the 2010 census, its population was 516 and it contained 216 housing units.

Beaver Township was organized in 1839, and named after Beaver Creek.

Geography

Unincorporated towns
 Lakeside at 
(This list is based on USGS data and may include former settlements.)

Adjacent townships
 Jefferson Township (north)
 Monroe Township (northeast)
 Indian Creek Township (east)
 Liberty Township, White County (south)
 Monon Township, White County (southwest)
 Salem Township (west)
 White Post Township (northwest)

Major highways
  Indiana State Road 39

School districts
 Eastern Pulaski Community School Corporation
 West Central School Corporation

Political districts
 Indiana's 2nd congressional district
 State House District 20
 State Senate District 18

References
 
 United States Census Bureau 2008 TIGER/Line Shapefiles
 IndianaMap

External links

Townships in Pulaski County, Indiana
Townships in Indiana